Mikels is a surname. Notable people with the surname include:

 Elaine Mikels (1921–2004), American social worker and activist
 Ted V. Mikels (1929–2016), American filmmaker

See also
 Mikel